Nicolás Renz Boher (born 7 April 1995) is a Chilean field hockey player.

Personal life
Nicolás Renz is the middle child, with brothers Fernando and Felipe also representing Chile.

Renz studied at the Pontificia Universidad Católica de Chile.

Career

Junior national team
In 2012 Renz made his debut for the Chilean U–21 team at the Pan American Junior Championship in Guadalajara, where he won a bronze medal.

He went on to represent the team numerous times. In 2016, he won a second bronze medal with the team at his second Pan American Junior Championship in Toronto.

Los Diablos
Nicolás Renz made his debut for Los Diablos in 2012, during the inaugural edition of the FIH World League.

In 2014, Renz won his first medal with the national team, at the South American Games in Santiago. The following year, he won bronze at the 2015 Pan American Games in Toronto. He won his second South American Games medal in 2018, taking silver at the tournament.

Renz was also a member of the national team at the 2019 Pan American Games in Lima.

References

External links

1995 births
Living people
Chilean male field hockey players
Sportspeople from Santiago
Field hockey players at the 2015 Pan American Games
Field hockey players at the 2019 Pan American Games
Pan American Games bronze medalists for Chile
Pan American Games medalists in field hockey
South American Games silver medalists for Chile
Competitors at the 2014 South American Games
Competitors at the 2018 South American Games
Medalists at the 2015 Pan American Games
21st-century Chilean people